Portals of Twilight is a supplement for fantasy role-playing games published by Judges Guild in 1981.

Contents
Portals of Twilight is a campaign setting that describes a fantasy world accessible by magical portal.  The book includes 32 wilderness locations, a city, and many new monsters.

Publication history
Portals of Twilight was written by Rudy Kraft, and was published by Judges Guild in 1981 as a 48-page book.

TSR opted not to renew Judges Guild's license for D&D when it expired in September 1980. They managed to hold onto their AD&D license a little while longer, so adventures like The Illhiedrin Book (1981), Zienteck (1981), Trial by Fire (1981), and Rudy Kraft's Portals of Twilight (1981) would finish off that line.

Reception
Michael Stackpole reviewed Portals of Twilight in The Space Gamer No. 50. The review states that "The real worth of a product is determined by how it sets the atmosphere for an adventure and what sort of characters will be met and dealt with in the adventure." Stackpole continued: "In this work, Rudy Kraft does a fine job of setting up atmosphere and all that in the first ten pages.  Then the rest of the 44-page booklet is used for charts and tables. No personalities or anything."

References

Judges Guild fantasy role-playing game supplements
Role-playing game supplements introduced in 1981